Epidendrum verrucosum is a species of Epidendrum orchid that was described by Schwartz in 1806.  In 1861, Reichenbach placed it in subsection Euepidendrum Planifolia Paniculata of the genus Epidendrum.

Homonymy
In 1844, Lindley published a description of a very different orchid, Encyclia adenocaula (Lex.) Schltr. (1918), under the name Epidendrum verrucosum, making Epidendrum verrucosum Lindl. (1844) an illegitimate name, and a synonym for Encyclia adenocaula.

References

verrucosum